The Sin Sister is a lost 1929 American silent drama adventure film directed by Charles Klein and starring Nancy Carroll. It was produced and distributed by the Fox Film Corporation. The film was released with a music score and sound effects track.

Cast
Nancy Carroll as Pearl
Lawrence Gray as Peter Van Dykeman
Josephine Dunn as Ethelyn Horn
Myrtle Stedman as Sister Burton
Anders Randolf as Joseph Horn
Richard Alexander as Bob Newton
Frederick Graham as Ship Captain
George Davis as Mate
David Callis as Al

See also
1937 Fox vault fire

References

External links

1929 films
Lost American films
Fox Film films
American silent feature films
American black-and-white films
American adventure drama films
1920s adventure drama films
1929 lost films
Lost adventure drama films
1929 drama films
Films with screenplays by Harry Behn
Films directed by Charles Klein
1920s American films
Silent American drama films
Silent adventure drama films